Georg Vinogradov (18 April 1915 – 12 January 2011) was a Russian-born Estonian basketball player.

Vinigradov was born in Pavlovsk, Russia. After emigrating with his family to Estonia, Vinogradov attended schools in Tallinn; he graduated from the Russian Gymnasium in 1933 then enrolled at the University of Tartu in 1935 to study economics. He began playing basketball under coaches Alexei Selenoi and Herbert Niiler. He competed mainly on the Russ and ÜENÜTO teams, and from 1936 until 1939, on the Estonia men's national basketball team. He was a member of the Estonian team at the 1936 Summer Olympics in Berlin but did not play in any games.

Vinogradov won 5th place at the European Basketball Championship in 1939, won a silver medal and bronze medal in 1937 at the World Student Games, and silver medal in volleyball in 1939. He was a member of the board of the Estonian Handball Association in 1944.

Following the Soviet occupation of Estonia in 1944 during World war II, Vinogradov fled to Sweden, then later to Canada in 1949 where he permanently settled. He died in  Montreal, Canada in 2011, aged 95. He is buried in Mount Royal Cemetery in Montreal.

References

1915 births
2011 deaths
Estonian men's basketball players
Olympic basketball players of Estonia
Basketball players at the 1936 Summer Olympics
University of Tartu alumni
Russian emigrants to Estonia
Estonian World War II refugees
Estonian emigrants to Canada
Estonian people of Russian descent
Basketball players from Saint Petersburg